Jirdeh or Jir Deh may refer to:
 Jirdeh, Fuman
 Jir Deh, Rudsar
 Jirdeh, Shaft
 Jirdeh-e Pasikhan, Shaft County
 Jirdeh Rural District, in Shaft County